Adam Magyar (born 1972) is a photographer and video artist.

Life and work 
Adam Magyar was born in Hungary in 1972. He began taking pictures in his late twenties, when he started wandering Asian cities capturing their street life in images of Indian street vendors, wandering holy men, and students in an exclusive Himalayan school. Obsessed with finding innovative new uses for digital technology, Magyar's work quickly evolved from conventional documentary photography to the radically experimental and surreal.

Among Magyar's numerous inventions is a way to insert motion into still images. In his attempt to comprehend the interface of time's infinite flow in the world's modern metropolises, he has developed techniques to capture, on a single visual plane, disjointed, fragmented images of parts of an individual or group on a crowded street. A theme that recurs throughout much of his body of work is based on interlinking yet distinct ideas and techniques that aid us to see the inherent beauty found in the everyday. His unique vision and technical abilities has inevitably led him to modify and even develop his own hardware and software. In his Urban Flow and Stainless works he uses the slit-scan photography technique, known also for use in photo finish cameras, as well as in other, often industrial, techniques. He uses a high-speed camera in his video series entitled Stainless, in which he captures at extremely high speeds densely populated urban areas. Magyar's work fuses the objective, even mathematical reality with the purely subjective, creating a unique fusion of technology and art.

Magyar spoke at several image festivals and conferences including TEDSalon Berlin, Bits of Knowledge, Adam Magyar: Photographing the Unfolding of Daily Life, Admiralspalast, Berlin, Germany (2014),  
TEDxGateway, Adam Magyar, Mumbai, India (2014),  
PopTech: Pop Casts, Adam Magyar: Photos of Time, Camden, ME (2013)

Solo exhibitions 
 2019 Midnight Moment - Times Square Arts, New York, NY
 2019 Stainless, Museo Casa Grande, Hidalgo, Mexico

 2018 Stainless, B24 Gallery, Debrecen, Hungary

 2017 Stainless, Alexanderplatz, 3 channel video installation, Museum of Fine Arts Houston, Houston, TX

 2015 Kontinuum, Julie Saul Gallery, New York, NY

 2013 Kontinuum, Opiom Gallery, Opio, France
 2013 Kontinuum, Griffin Museum of Photography, Winchester, MA
 2013 Kontinuum, Houston Center for Photography, Houston, TX
 2013 Kontinuum, Light Work, Syracuse, NY

 2012 Kontinuum, Faur Zsófi Gallery, Budapest, Hungary

 2011 Underworld, BSA @ CHB, Berlin, Germany
 2011 Beyond Perspective, Karin Weber Gallery, Hong Kong

 2006 Comearound, Retorta Gallery, Budapest, Hungary

 2005 TaxiJam, Miro Photo Gallery, Budapest, Hungary

 2002 Kashi Vishwanath Express, Miro Photo Gallery, Budapest, Hungary

Group exhibitions 
 2019 Preparing for darkness #vol3, Selected artists @ Kühlhaus, Berlin
 2019 Al Obour, Saudi Art Council, Jeddah, Saudi Arabia

 2018 L’équipe du Festival Locomotion, Nancy, France
 2018 Preparing for darkness #vol2, Selected artists @ Kühlhaus, Berlin
 2018 Polylux, Mecklenburgisches Künstlerhaus Schloss Plüschow, Germany
 2018 Preparing for darkness, Selected artists at Kühlhaus, Berlin

 2017 Immanence, Pictura, Groningen, Netherlands
 2017 Accentuated Reality, Faur Zsofi Gallery, Budapest, Hungary

 2016 Envisioning the Future!, Saitama Triennale 2016, Japan
 2016 Impact: Abstractions and Experiment in Hungarian Photography, Alma, New York, NY
 2016 Infinite Pause: Photography and Time, Museum of Fine Arts Houston, TX
 2016 Langoureusement, Association Light Matter, Metz, France
 2016 Photography and Film Constructs, Ringling College Willis Smith Gallery, Sarasota, FL

 2015 Laps, La Carreau de Cergy, Cergy, France
 2015 Public Eye: 175 Years of Sharing Photograph, New York Public Library, New York, NY.
 2015 Night on Earth, BSA @ CHB, Berlin, Germany
 2015 Ideas City Conference, New Museum, New York, NY
 2015 Look3, Festival of the Photograph, Charlottesville, VA
 2015 Subway, Stephen Bulger Gallery, Toronto, Canada

 2014 UNKNOWN: Pictures of Strangers, Transformer Station, Cleveland, OH
 2014 Public Eye: 175 Years of Sharing Photograph, New York Public Library, New York, NY.
 2014 Urban Spirit, curated by Dr. Katia David and Ágnes Lőrincz, Galerie Wedding, Berlin, Germany
 2014 Megapolis, Eres Foundation, Munich, Germany
 2014 METRO, Reinier Gerritsen, Adam Magyar, David Molander, Julie Saul Gallery, New York, NY
 2014 Trailed Away, Gallery Soso, Seoul, South Korea
 2014 Lapse, curated by Djeff and Fanny Serain, Vasarely Foundation, Aix-en-Provence, France

 2013 Hungarian Art Photography in the New Millennium, Hungarian National Gallery, Budapest, Hungary
 2013 Love Will Destroy Us In The End, BSA at Art Suites Gallery, Istanbul, Turkey
 2013 Light of Day, Transformer Station, Cleveland, OH

 2012 Breaking God’s Heart, BSA @ Liebkranz Galerie, Berlin, Germany
 2012 Helsinki Photography Biennial, Helsinki City Museum, Finland

 2011 Life as it seems, Faur ZSofi Gallery, Budapest, Germany
 2011 Lens Culture International Exposure Awards:31 Contemporary Photographers, Gallery 291, San Francisco; Speos Gallery, Paris; VII Dumbo, New York, NY
 2011 Young European Landscape BSA @ CHB, Berlin; BSA @ Galerie Wolfsen, Aalborg, Denmark
 2011 Flashart, Whart, Toulouse, France

 2010 Photographie Hongroise Contemporaine, Faur ZSofi Gallery - Institut Hongrois, Paris, France
 2010 Separated by Daily Life, Rhubarb East at Mailbox, Birmingham, AL

 2009 Defining Urban Life, Karin Weber Gallery, Hong Kong
 2009 Art Sunday, Karin Weber Gallery, Hong Kong

 2008 Jozsef Pecsi Scholarship Annual Exhibition, Hungarian House of Photography, Budapest, Hungary

 2007 It depends on your point of view, Metro Gallery, Budapest, Hungary
 2007 Bits, Bytes and Pixels, Island6, Shanghai, China
 2007 Jozsef Pecsi Photography Scholarship Winners Exhibition, Hungarian Academy, Rome, Italy

 2006 I Love LEDs, Island6, Shanghai, China
 2006 Getting Along, Island6, Shanghai, China

 2004 Press Photo Exhibition, Ethnographic Museum Budapest

Collections 
His work is included in several public collections including:

 Light Work, Syracuse, NY
 Museum of Fine Arts, Houston, TX
 Nelson-Atkins Museum of Art, Kansas City, MO
 New York Public Library, New York, NY

Publications 
Contact Sheet 170: Adam Magyar, Light Work

Scholarships and awards 
'2009 International Photography Award, 1st place in Fine Art - Collage subcategory for Squares, 1st place in Special - Aerial subcategory for Squares,2006-2007 Jozsef Pecsi Scholarship,2004'' Grand Prize, Hungarian Press Photo

References

External links 
 Adam Magyar's website
 Videos: Stainless
 Videos: Array
 Einstein’s Camera
 Medium: Alone Together
 Adam Magyar: Photos of time
 Why Time Needs to Slow Down - Interview with Adam Magyar
 Ever feel alone in a crowded place? This artist gets you
 See Time Stop and Space Stretch in Adam Magyar's Latest Slit-Scans
 Seven Photographers Who Are Rewriting Street Photography's Rigid Rules

1972 births
Living people
Fine art photographers
21st-century photographers
Street photographers
Hungarian photographers